Mike Bamber (born 1 October 1980) is an English footballer who played in The Football League for Macclesfield Town.

References

English footballers
Macclesfield Town F.C. players
English Football League players
1980 births
Living people
Association football defenders